The Memphis Police Department is a law enforcement agency in Tennessee in the United States.

Organization 

The Memphis Police Department (MPD) provides police services to the people of the city of Memphis in a 304-square-mile area with 2,081 officers. There are nine precincts in the Memphis area. The chief of police is appointed by the mayor and ratified by the city council.

The administrative services department provides services that enable the other programs to effectively respond to service calls. It provides security services; warrant, subpoena, and property processing; radio and telephone communications; inspection of police services; and management of information and human resources. Additional functions include the reporting and recording of crimes and incidents and personnel development.

The investigative services department includes the domestic violence bureau, the homicide, the missing person's bureau, the sex crimes/juvenile abuse bureau, the general investigative bureau, the felony response bureau, and support units.

Uniform patrol is divided into the geographic areas of Tillman Station (Central Precinct), North Main Station (Downtown Precinct), Appling Farms Station (Northeast Precinct), Crump Station (West Precinct), Mt. Moriah Station (East Precinct), Old Allen Station (North Precinct), Raines Station (South Precinct), Airways Station (Southeast Precinct), Ridgeway Station, and Union Station (Traffic Division).

Staff representation by race is 52 percent African American/Black, 47 percent White, and one percent Hispanic. 84 percent of staff are male, and 16 percent are female.

Officers are issued the SIG Sauer P229R DAK .40 S&W as the sidearm of choice.

Rank structure and insignia 

The MPD uses these ranks:

The assistant chief insignia is four stars arranged in a diamond pattern.

History 

The Memphis Police Department was founded in 1827. In 1878, the 55-man police department was devastated by the yellow fever epidemic with all 55 officers stricken, and 10 officers dying. By 1927, the city's murder rate was 69.3 per 100,000 population, the highest in the country. In comparison, Chicago, then controlled by Al Capone, had a murder rate of only 13.3 per 100,000. Memphis police officers Thomas Waterson and Sergeant William Raney captured George "Machine Gun" Kelly in 1933. The first African American officers were hired in 1948, twenty years before the 1968 Assassination of Martin Luther King Jr. in Memphis which sparked riots and curfews across the city. In 1973, the department witnessed the formation of two police unions—the Afro-American Police Association and the Memphis Police Association, a bargaining unit representing patrolmen and sergeants, and in 1978 the department went on an eight-day strike in a labor dispute with city leaders.

In 1979, the city admitted that written tests used in the police hiring and promotion process had a disparate impact on blacks. In 2002, a test used in the promotion process resulted in 31 percent of black candidates promoted, and 73 percent of whites. In 2006, a court ruled the 2002 test violated the Civil Rights Act of 1964, and "28 plaintiffs with passing exam scores and sufficient work experience were promoted"; a decision reversed in 2014 by the United States Court of Appeals for the Sixth Circuit.

James Ivy became the city's first African-American police director in 1988. 1992 saw Eddie B. Adair named the first African American chief of police

In 1992, Sergeant Jim Nichols, assigned to MPD Research & Development, formed a non-profit organization that raised money to allow MPD to become one of the first law enforcement agencies in Tennessee to utilize computers in a networks systems, where each detective, as well as the executive administration, had a computer on their desk to assist in writing up reports, running background checks, send and receive an email as well as other administrative needs relating to law enforcement.

In June 2013, Officer Brandon Berry was charged with forcing men to have sex with him in exchange for not arresting them on outstanding warrants. The next month officer Jason Webb was fired when he was charged with soliciting sex from an underage prostitute. In August 2013, Officer Vance Stacks was convicted of drunk driving and weapons charges related to a traffic accident in 2011. In September 2013, Officer Alex Beard plead guilty to reduced charges as a result of reckless behavior. In August 2012, while driving his official vehicle at more than ninety miles an hour without lights or a siren, he struck another car, killing a woman and her daughter. Beard was sentenced to six months in jail and six years on probation. In December 2013, Officer Matthew Ashmore was arrested after child pornography was found on his telephone.

In July 2014, hundreds of policemen called in sick apparently to protest the city reducing pay by 4.6 percent while giving millions of dollars to private entities. On July 5, 181 officers called in sick. The following Monday, 550 officers did not come to work. In late 2014, press reports indicated that the department had 11,000 untested rape kits on hand.

The new MPD headquarters at 170 North Main Street, was opened in 2017.

In 2018 due to a shortage of police officer staff and candidates, the requirement that newly-hired officers have a college degree was removed; officers were instead given four years to obtain a college degree after being hired. The Memphis Police Association opposed the change, saying "citizens deserve quality officers", and described the change as "lowering the standards". The same year, MPD was sued by the American Civil Liberties Union of Tennessee for violating a 1978 decree by surveilling on citizens for political purposes. White MPD Sergeant Timothy Reynolds admitted in the trial that he pretended to be a black man named "Bob Smith" on Facebook to spy on activists participating in the Black Lives Matter movement, one of them being journalist and founder of MLK50 Wendi C. Thomas. Judge Jon Phipps McCalla ruled that MPD was guilty of violating the decree.

In late 2020, retired African- American MPD Homicide Investigator Eric Kelly was charged with having a sexual relationship with a murder suspect.

In October 2021, MPD launched the SCORPION (street crimes operation to restore peace in our neighborhoods) specialized unit which targeted high-impact crimes and gang-related offenses. The unit had three teams totaling about 30 officers. The same year, the department appointed the first female and first African American Chief of Police, Cerelyn J. Davis. Also in 2021, Mayor Strickland's Advisory Council Reimagining Police report was released with recommendations. In 2023, Following the killing of Tyre Nichols, a young Black man, the SCORPION unit was disbanded, by Police Chief Davis who also terminated the employment of five associated officers.

On March 8, 2023, the United States Department of Justice announced that it would investigate the Memphis PD fallowing the killing of Tyre Nichols.

See also 

 Crime in Memphis, Tennessee
 Gangs in Memphis, Tennessee
 List of law enforcement agencies in Tennessee

References

External links 

 Official website

1827 establishments in Tennessee
Municipal police departments of Tennessee
Government of Memphis, Tennessee